Rafalus arabicus is a species of jumping spider (family Salticidae) in the genus Rafalus that lives in the United Arab Emirates. It was first described in 2010. The spider is distinguished by its thin palpal bulb and, in the female, the design of the epigyne which lacks the pocket found in other members of the genus.

References

Salticidae
Spiders of Asia
Spiders described in 2010